Australian Musician magazine was launched by the Australian Music Association in 1995 as a quarterly, colour publication in print. Its aim was to inform, educate and entertain local musicians of all levels. It was an initiative of AMA executive committee member, Alex Bolt and was produced by Executive Officer Rob Walker, who acted as Managing Editor, and was designed and edited by Greg Phillips (Mediaville). Greg was appointed Managing Editor in 2001 and has continued in this role to the present day. It was available free from musical instrument retailers nationally in Australia similar to other music street press like Mixdown.

The Australian Music Association created the magazine as a way of inspiring people to play a musical instrument. It was aimed at musicians and presented predominantly by musicians. It featured artists interviews, album reviews, gear news, road tests, and music lessons. As the magazine was free and an independent publication which did not need to consider magazine sales, it had the freedom to explore issues facing musicians in Australia that other publications may not have been able to. Australian Musician built a reputation for its use of high-profile recording artists as contributors to the magazine.

Some of Australia's most respected musicians such as Tommy Emmanuel, INXS, Kate Ceberano, Wolfmother, Little Birdy and Evermore have contributed to Australian Musician magazine. One of Australian Musicians most publicised editions was the Ms Musician Edition (distributed in December 2007), an all-female edition guest edited by Capitol Recording artist Clare Bowditch. It is widely regarded that this is the only edition of a musicians' magazine worldwide in which all articles were about female artists and written by female writers. Even the road tests of guitars, amplifiers, effects units and keyboards, traditionally a male domain, were written by women. Other issues of note were those guest edited by The Drones and Powderfinger.

Australian Musician specialised in covering band's soundchecks, whereby the magazine had editorial and photographic access to some of the world's finest acts during rehearsals, giving its readers a view of rock music from the inside. Artists that have allowed the magazine access include The Rolling Stones, Joe Satriani, The Thrills, Roger Waters', Sepultura and many more.

In late 2011, the publishing of Australian Musician was outsourced. In October 2012, the publishing licence of the magazine was returned to the Australian Music Association and since, Australian Musician has been in recess. It was, until then, Australia's longest continuously running musician's magazine. The Australian Music Association relaunched Australian Musician in March 2014 as an online publication with the same goals and philosophies … assisting the Australian music community by providing artist exposure and information on, and promotion of, the tools that musicians use to create their art.

See also

 Music of Australia
 Culture of Australia

References

External links
 Australian Musician
 Australian Music Association

1995 establishments in Australia
2011 disestablishments in Australia
Defunct magazines published in Australia
Magazines established in 1995
Magazines disestablished in 2011
Music magazines published in Australia
Online music magazines published in Australia
Online magazines with defunct print editions
Quarterly magazines published in Australia